The Swatch Group Ltd is a Swiss manufacturer of watches and jewellery. The company was founded in 1983 by the merger of ASUAG and SSIH to move to manufacturing quartz-crystal watches to resolve the quartz crisis threatening the traditional Swiss watchmaking industry.

The Swatch Group is the world's largest watch company and employs about 36,000 people in 50 countries. The group owns the Swatch product line and other brands, including Blancpain, Breguet, Certina, ETA, Glashütte Original, Hamilton, Harry Winston, Longines, Mido, Omega, Rado, and Tissot.

History

SSIH
SSIH (Société Suisse pour l'Industrie Horlogère), originated in 1930 with the merger of the Omega and Tissot companies. Swiss watch quality was high, but new technology, such as the Hamilton Electric watch introduced in 1957 and the Bulova Accutron tuning fork watch in 1961, presaged increasing technological competition.

In the late 1970s, SSIH became insolvent due in part to a recession and in part to heavy competition from inexpensive Asian-made quartz crystal watches. These difficulties occurred even though it had become Switzerland's largest, and the world's third largest, producer of watches. Its creditor banks assumed control in 1981.

ASUAG
ASUAG (Allgemeine Gesellschaft der Schweizerischen Uhrenindustrie), formed in 1931, was the world's largest producer of watch movements and the parts thereof (balance wheels, balance springs (spiral), assortments, watch stones ("rubis"). ASUAG had also integrated an array of watch brands in 1972 into a sub-holding company, General Watch Co. ASUAG failed similarly in 1982.

The Swatch Group
ASUAG/SSIH was formed in 1983 from the two financially troubled predecessor companies, ASUAG and SSIH. Taken private in 1985 by then-CEO Nicolas Hayek, with the understanding of the Swiss banks and the financial assistance of a group of Swiss private investors (in particular Stephan Schmidheiny and Esther Grether), it was renamed SMH (Société de Microélectronique et d'Horlogerie) in 1986, and ultimately Swatch Group Ltd in 1998.

The "swatch" brand of watch was launched in 1983, by the ETA SA CEO Ernst Thomke and his engineers. The quartz watch was redesigned for manufacturing efficiency and fewer parts, and the styling and design were updated.

Brands 

Over the years, the Swatch Group acquired various watchmaking companies, including Blancpain S. A. (founded 1735, bought by Swatch in 1992), Breguet S. A. (founded 1775, bought in 1999), and Glashütte Original (Germany, bought in 2000). The company continued to produce watches under these names.

HW Holding Inc., owner of Harry Winston, Inc., an American jewellery and luxury watch company, was acquired on 26 March 2013 for 711 million Swiss francs. Nayla Hayek became the CEO. The company bought the world's biggest flawless blue diamond, The Winston Blue, on 15 May 2014.

The following list includes the brands owned by the Swatch Group:

 Balmain
 Blancpain
 Breguet
 Certina
 Endura
 Flik Flak
 Glashütte Original
 Hamilton
 Harry Winston
 Jaquet Droz
 Léon Hatot
 Longines
 Mido 
 Omega
 Rado
 Swatch
 Swiss Timing
 Tissot
 Union Glashütte

Watch manufacturing

ETA movement
Swatch subsidiary ETA SA, which is based in Grenchen, Switzerland, furnishes many OEM brands, such as LVMH (which markets TAG Heuer, Hublot and Zenith watch lines) and Richemont (which markets amongst others, A. Lange & Söhne, Baume & Mercier, IWC Schaffhausen, Jaeger-LeCoultre, Officine Panerai, Piaget, Roger Dubuis, Vacheron Constantin).

Electronic systems
The Swatch Group Electronic System includes:
Belenos Clean Power AG.
 EM Microelectronic-Marin: Designs and produces ultra-low power, low voltage mixed-signal integrated circuits, LCD and modules. IC Product lines include RFID, microcontroller, smart card, ASIC, RTC, reset circuit, watchdog, LCD driver, opto ICs.
 Micro Crystal: produces miniature low power quartz crystals and small low power oscillators.
 Renata: develops and produces micro batteries. Product lines include button cells and rechargeable (Lithium Polymer) batteries.

Swatch Internet Time 
In 1998, Swatch invented "Swatch Internet Time", intended as a global time system, which divides the day into 1000 "beats" in a single worldwide time zone.

In October 2004, Swatch introduced its first smart watch, the Paparazzi, based on Microsoft Corporation's SPOT (Smart Personal Objects Technology.)

Watchmaking school 
The Swatch Group started offering their first class in the Nicolas G. Hayek Watchmaking School in Miami, Florida, in September 2005. There are other watchmaking schools in Glashütte, Germany; Pforzheim, Germany; Kuala Lumpur, Malaysia; and Shanghai, China.

Sponsorship

Sport and event timing 
Swiss Timing, under brands such as Omega, Longines, and Tissot, provide timing services for sporting events such as Formula One, Olympic Games, Tour de France, and equestrian events. In 2018 it was announced that The Swatch Group would hold its own watch fair in Zurich, during Baselworld 2019.

Ventures
In 1994, Swatch entered into a joint venture with Germany's Daimler AG to produce the Smart car, but they later withdrew from this project.

Swatch subsidiary Belenos Clean Power AG entered into a joint venture with the Paul Scherrer Institut in May 2008 to develop a hydrogen fuel cell for a fuel cell powered car.  Swatch began test drives of the car in Switzerland in 2012. However, the Swatch Group abandoned the project for a fuel-cell-powered car in June 2015, to concentrate instead on a new type of battery with high storage capacity.

See also
Quartz crisis
List of watch manufacturers

References

Further reading
 Ram Mudambi, "Branding Time: Swatch and Global Brand Management" Temple University IGMS Case Series No. 05-001, January 2005

External links

 
 The Nicolas G. Hayek Watchmaking School
 The Swatch Group – history

 
Companies listed on the SIX Swiss Exchange
Swiss companies established in 1983
Manufacturing companies established in 1983
Holding companies established in 1983
Holding companies of Switzerland
Luxury brand holding companies
Multinational companies headquartered in Switzerland
Watch manufacturing companies of Switzerland
Watchmaking conglomerates